Dows  is a surname. Notable people with the surname include:

Notable people 

 William Greene Dows (1864–1926), Railroad executive and namesake of Dows, Iowa
 Alice Olin Dows (1881–1963) American socialite and poet
 Olin Dows (1904–1981) American artist
 Carmen Vial Freire Dows (1904–1978) Chilean diplomat

Places
Dows Creek
Dows, Iowa
Dows Community School District

Other
Davenport v. Dows U.S. Supreme Court case (1873)

See also
 Dow (surname)
 Dowe (disambiguation)
 Dows, Iowa